Lalit Mohan Thapar (27 October 1930 – 17 January 2007), often referred to by his initials LMT, headed the LM Thapar Group of companies. He was born to Karam Chand Thapar, the founder of  the Thapar Group of companies that owned companies such as Crompton Greaves, BILT and JCT Mills. Inder Mohan Thapar, Brij Mohan Thapar and Man Mohan Thapar are his brothers.

He was educated at The Doon School. He graduated in engineering from the University of Southern California, USA. He became chairman of Ballarpur Industries Limited in 1962. He died of heart failure and kidney failure in New Delhi on 17 January 2007.

Thapar Group

The Thapar Group was established by Lala Karam Chand Thapar. After his death in 1963, his third son, L.M. Thapar, took over the Group, which then included the Oriental Bank of Commerce, as well as Oriental Insurance. Both these companies were subsequently nationalised. Other Group companies and concerns in India are or were The Pioneer, Greaves Cotton, JCT Mills, JCT Electronics, Crompton Greaves and Ballarpur Industries.

With the division of the Thapar family assets, L.M. Thapar inherited, among other companies, BILT. BILT eventually became part of the Avantha Group.

Personal life
Single and a resident of New Delhi's upmarket Amrita Shergill Marg, Thapar was fond of the good life and was known for being charming and polished. He was an avid art collector, with an impressive personal gallery of some of the finest works of art. His bon vivant persona was highlighted in most of his obituaries.

In 2005, he handed over the reins of his business empire to his nephew Gautam (son of Brij Mohan Thapar), leaving his voting rights, shares and most of his personal effects to Gautam in his will. Thapar died on 17 January 2007 from heart failure and kidney failure at a hospital in New Delhi. His remains were cremated the following day at the Lodhi Cremation Ground in Delhi.

He funded a project to document and verify data with regard to dead martyrs of the Indian Armed Forces at a time when publicly getting such accurate information was difficult.

References

External links
 Businessworld Obituary
 Economic Times
LM Thapar MBA Admission 2018

Economist

Thapar, L.M.
Thapar, L.M.
L
The Doon School alumni
Thapar, L.M.